Bob Vylan Presents the Price of Life is the second studio album of London-based duo Bob Vylan, released on 22 April 2022 by Ghost Theatre. The album was produced, mixed and recorded by the duo, with contributions from Laurent 'Lags' Barnard of Gallows, Bobby Bentham of Strange Bones, and Josh and Jon Skints (Joshua Waters Rudge and Jonathan Doyle) of the Skints. Upon its release, the album was met with universal critical acclaim.

The album was named Best Album at the 2022 Kerrang! Awards.

References 

2022 albums